Master of the Holy Blood (active 1510–1520) was an Early Netherlandish painter.

Little is known of his/her life. This painter is named after a work in the Museum of the Holy Blood, which has remained in the same location through the centuries.

References 

 record in the RKD

1530s deaths
Early Netherlandish painters
Artists from Bruges